Metsho Gewog (Dzongkha: སྨད་མཚོ་) is a gewog (village block) of Lhuntse District, Bhutan.

References

Lhuntse District